Wanda Fukała-Kaczmarczyk (born 2 September 1935) is a Polish fencer. She competed in the women's individual and team foil events at the 1960 Summer Olympics and the team foil at the 1968 Games.

References

1935 births
Living people
Polish female fencers
Olympic fencers of Poland
Fencers at the 1960 Summer Olympics
Fencers at the 1968 Summer Olympics
Sportspeople from Katowice
21st-century Polish women
20th-century Polish women